Louis Devoti (10 August 1926 – 6 August 2020) was a French basketball player. He competed in the men's tournament at the 1952 Summer Olympics.

References

External links
 

1926 births
2020 deaths
French men's basketball players
Olympic basketball players of France
Basketball players at the 1952 Summer Olympics
Place of birth missing